Erich Spörer (23 April 1911 – 11 November 1977) was a German sports shooter. He competed in two events at the 1952 Summer Olympics.

References

1911 births
1977 deaths
German male sport shooters
Olympic shooters of Germany
Shooters at the 1952 Summer Olympics
Place of birth missing